Caubous is the name of the following communes in France:

 Caubous, Haute-Garonne, in the Haute-Garonne department
 Caubous, Hautes-Pyrénées, in the Hautes-Pyrénées department